H. Krieghoff GmbH is a German manufacturer of high-end hunting and sporting firearms, based in Ulm, Germany.

In North American markets, their products are distributed via sister company Krieghoff International Inc., located in Ottsville, Pennsylvania.

References

Further reading

External links
 
 Krieghoff International, the sister company of Krieghoff in USA

Firearm manufacturers of Germany
German companies established in 1886
Companies based in Ulm